Drunken Gulch is a valley in Mariposa County, California, in the United States.

Drunken Gulch was likely named by prospectors during or after the California Gold Rush.

References

Valleys of Mariposa County, California
Valleys of California